Hampton High School is a public high school located in Hampton, Georgia, United States. During the 19th Century Hampton was served by its own public high school, with more than 100 students attending in 1886. The school continued in existence throughout the 20th Century.

Construction of a new Hampton High School broke ground on July 9, 2012, and became the 10th high school in Henry County, Georgia.

Footnotes

Schools in Henry County, Georgia
Public high schools in Georgia (U.S. state)